Hagers Grove is an unincorporated community in Shelby County, in the U.S. state of Missouri.

History
A post office called Hager's Grove was established in 1851, and remained in operation until 1915. The community has the name of John Hager, the original owner of the town site.

References

Unincorporated communities in Shelby County, Missouri
Unincorporated communities in Missouri